Karl Bewerunge (January 20, 1913 – August 26, 1993) was a German politician of the Christian Democratic Union (CDU) and former member of the German Bundestag.

Life 
After the Second World War, Bewerunge became a member of the CDU. He had been a member of the district council and a member of the district committee since 1953. He was a member of the German Bundestag from 1961 to 1976. From 1969 onwards he was deputy chairman of the Committee for Food, Agriculture and Forestry. He had always entered parliament via the state list of the CDU North Rhine-Westphalia.

Literature

References

1913 births
1993 deaths
Members of the Bundestag for North Rhine-Westphalia
Members of the Bundestag 1972–1976
Members of the Bundestag 1969–1972
Members of the Bundestag 1965–1969
Members of the Bundestag 1961–1965
Members of the Bundestag for the Christian Democratic Union of Germany